The name Scoobies can refer to:

 Scoubidous, a toy made of coloured plastic strands
 The "Mystery, Inc." gang from the animated television series Scooby-Doo
 The main protagonists of the television series Buffy: The Vampire Slayer